The Roman Catholic Diocese of San Lorenzo is a diocese located in the city of San Lorenzo in the Ecclesiastical province of Asunción in Paraguay.

History
 On May 18, 2000, the Diocese of San Lorenzo was established from the Metropolitan Archdiocese of Asunción

Leadership
 Bishops of San Lorenzo (Roman rite), in reverse chronological order
 Bishop Joaquín Hermes Robledo Romero (July 4, 2015 – present)
 Bishop Sebelio Peralta Álvarez (December 27, 2008 – November 19, 2014)
 Bishop Adalberto Martínez Flores (May 18, 2000 – February 19, 2007), appointed Bishop of San Pedro

References
 GCatholic.org
 Catholic Hierarchy
  Diocese website (Spanish) 

Roman Catholic dioceses in Paraguay
Christian organizations established in 2000
Roman Catholic dioceses and prelatures established in the 20th century
San Lorenzo, Roman Catholic Diocese of
Central Department
San Lorenzo, Paraguay